William Wesley Neighbors (February 4, 1940 – April 30, 2012) was an American football guard who played in the American Football League (AFL) from 1962 to 1969. Born in Tuscaloosa, Alabama, he played college football at the University of Alabama where he was a consensus All-American in 1961 and was selected in sixth round of the 1962 AFL Draft.  Neighbors was also drafted in the fourth round of the 1962 NFL Draft by the Washington Redskins.  Neighbors was selected to the Boston Patriots All-1960s (AFL) Team and was inducted to the College Football Hall of Fame in 2003.

His son, Wes Neighbors, was an All-Southeastern Conference center at Alabama from 1984 to 1986. His grandson Wes, is a former player at Alabama and current assistant coach. Neighbors died of a heart attack in 2012.

References

1940 births
2012 deaths
American football offensive guards
Alabama Crimson Tide football players
Boston Patriots players
Miami Dolphins players
All-American college football players
American Football League All-Star players
College Football Hall of Fame inductees
Sportspeople from Tuscaloosa, Alabama
Players of American football from Alabama
American Football League players